City of Love is the ninth studio album by Scottish pop rock band Deacon Blue, released through Earmusic on 6 March 2020. It is their first album since 2016's Believers. It was promoted by the lead single, the title track "City of Love".

Background
Singer Ricky Ross said he thought it would be interesting to record the album in the Gorbals area "right in the heart of Glasgow" after learning that "there are bones reputedly belonging to St Valentine in St Francis' church" there.

Critical reception

Reviewing the album for PopMatters, Adam Mason wrote that it features "11 open-hearted and largely sentimental songs with big choruses and traditional rock instruments", describing the band as having written "crowd-pleasers [...] with a firm eye on recapturing their glory days. They aim for singalong tunes that will stand proud with old favorites at their outdoor shows this summer". Brett Callwood of LA Weekly found City of Love to be free of filler, writing that "everything that made their past work so special shines here too [...] It all sounds so effortless, nothing is forced, and yet it's clear that they worked hard about this slab of work". Writing for Belfast Telegraph, Steve Grantham called the album a "solid, well-produced set, with big choruses where they are needed and more subtle contemplation when not. It will, no doubt, please the band's fans and may, given enough exposure, gain them some more."

Track listing

Charts

References

2020 albums
Deacon Blue albums